Eurykleia (minor planet designation: 195 Eurykleia) is a fairly large main belt asteroid. It was discovered by the Austrian astronomer Johann Palisa on April 19, 1879, and named after Euryclea, the wet-nurse of Odysseus in The Odyssey.

The orbital plane is inclined by 7° from the plane of the ecliptic. It is spinning with a rotation period of 16.5 hours and varies in brightness with an amplitude of 0.24 magnitude. The cross-section diameter of this body is 43 km. The asteroid has a taxonomic type of Ch in the SMASS classification, which indicates it has a dark surface with a primitive carbonaceous composition.

195 Eurykleia has been observed to occult stars twice, once in 2011 and again in 2021.

References

External links
 
 

C-type asteroids (Tholen)
Ch-type asteroids (SMASS)
Background asteroids
Eurykleia
Eurykleia
18790419